"Assassin" is a song by English electronic music group the Orb. It was released as a stand-alone single in October 1992 by Big Life and reached number 12 on the UK Singles Chart.

References

1992 singles
1992 songs
Big Life Records singles
The Orb songs